Beccarinda is a genus of flowering plants belonging to the family Gesneriaceae.

Its native range is Indo-China, Southern China.

Species:

Beccarinda argentea 
Beccarinda cordifolia 
Beccarinda erythrotricha 
Beccarinda griffithii 
Beccarinda minima 
Beccarinda paucisetulosa 
Beccarinda sinensis 
Beccarinda sumatrana 
Beccarinda tonkinensis

References

Didymocarpoideae
Gesneriaceae genera